Yakhdan is a village in Urozgan Province, Afghanistan. It is the home town of Nasrat Khan.

References

Populated places in Urozgan Province